The 2017 German Darts Masters was the second of twelve PDC European Tour events on the 2017 PDC Pro Tour. The tournament took place at Sparkassen-Arena, Jena, Germany, between 15–17 April 2017. It featured a field of 48 players and £135,000 in prize money, with £25,000 going to the winner.

Michael van Gerwen was the defending champion, having beaten Peter Wright 6–4 in the final of the previous edition, and he defended his title by defeating Jelle Klaasen 6–2 in the final.

Prize money
This is how the prize money is divided:

Qualification and format
The top 16 players from the PDC ProTour Order of Merit on 23 March automatically qualified for the event and were seeded in the second round.

The remaining 32 places went to players from five qualifying events - 18 from the UK Qualifier (held in Milton Keynes on 31 March), eight from the West/South European Qualifier (held on 23 March), four from the Host Nation Qualifier (held on 14 April), one from the Nordic & Baltic Qualifier (held on 17 February) and one from the East European Qualifier (held on 25 February).

The following players took part in the tournament:

Top 16
  Michael van Gerwen (champion)
  Peter Wright (quarter-finals)
  Mensur Suljović (third round)
  Simon Whitlock (semi-finals)
  Benito van de Pas (second round)
  Ian White (second round)
  James Wade (semi-finals)
  Alan Norris (second round)
  Kim Huybrechts (third round)
  Gerwyn Price (third round)
  Jelle Klaasen (runner-up)
  Michael Smith (quarter-finals)
  Joe Cullen (second round)
  Steve West (second round)
  Stephen Bunting (third round)
  Cristo Reyes (third round)

UK Qualifier 
  Ronnie Baxter (first round)
  Daryl Gurney (second round)
  Brian Woods (first round)
  Robert Owen (first round)
  Kyle Anderson (quarter-finals)
  Mervyn King (second round)
  Justin Pipe (first round)
  Robbie Green (first round)
  Robert Thornton (second round)
  Ted Evetts (second round)
  Andrew Gilding (first round)
  Raymond van Barneveld (quarter-finals)
  Jamie Lewis (second round)
  Ricky Evans (first round)
  Mark Webster (second round)
  Adrian Lewis (first round)
  Jonny Clayton (second round)
  Joe Murnan (first round)

West/South European Qualifier
  Dirk van Duijvenbode (first round)
  Sven Groen (first round)
  Jeffrey de Graaf (third round)
  Ronny Huybrechts (first round)
  Zoran Lerchbacher (first round)
  Michael Plooy (first round)
  Rowby-John Rodriguez  (third round)
  John Michael (second round)

Host Nation Qualifier
  Steffen Siepmann (third round)
  Robert Marijanović (first round)
  Max Hopp (second round)
  Dragutin Horvat (second round)

Nordic & Baltic Qualifier
  Daniel Larsson (second round)

East European Qualifier
  Krzysztof Ratajski (first round)

Draw

References

2017 PDC European Tour
2017 in German sport